Tisinec is a village and municipality in Stropkov District in the Prešov Region of north-eastern Slovakia.

History
In historical records the village was first mentioned in 1379.

Geography
The municipality lies at an altitude of 195 metres and covers an area of 3.758 km². It has a population of about 428 people.

Climate
The Köppen Climate Classification subtype for this climate is "Dfb" (Warm Summer Continental Climate).

References

External links
 
 

Villages and municipalities in Stropkov District
Šariš